The 2011–12 Ukrainian Premier League Reserves season was a competition between the reserves of Ukrainian Premier League Clubs. The events in the senior leagues during the 2010–11 season saw Metalurh Zaporizhzhia Reserves and PFC Sevastapol Reserves all relegated and replaced by the promoted teams PFC Oleksandria Reserves and Chornomorets Odesa Reserves.

Managers

Final standings

Top scorers

 During the winter break Karavayev went on loan to FC Sevastopol

See also
2011-12 Ukrainian Premier League

References

Reserves
Ukrainian Premier Reserve League seasons